The Cheerful-class gunboat was a class of twenty gunboats built for the Royal Navy in 1855 for use in the Crimean War.

Design
The Cheerful class was designed by W.H. Walker (who also designed the preceding  and  classes). The ships were of particularly shallow draft  for coastal bombardment in the shallow waters of the Baltic and Black Sea during the Crimean War.

Propulsion

Armament
Ships of the class were armed with two 32-pounder smooth bore muzzle loading cannons.

Ships

Notes

References

Gunboat classes
 Cheerful
Gunboats of the Royal Navy